Local elections were held in Trust Territory of Somaliland in May 1954 to elect members of 35 municipalities. The Somali Youth League won just over half of the 281 seats up for election.

Campaign
A total of 15 parties and organisations contested the elections:

Results

References

1954 in Somalia
Italian Somaliland
Elections in Somalia
May 1954 events in Africa